Skip Lievsay is an American supervising sound editor, re-recording mixer and sound designer for film and television,  Lievsay has worked with filmmakers and directors including the Coen brothers, Martin Scorsese, Spike Lee, Jonathan Demme and Robert Altman.

In January 2007, he received two Oscar nominations—for Best Sound Mixing and Best Sound Editing—for his work on Joel and Ethan Coen's No Country for Old Men. In 2011, he was nominated in the same categories for the film True Grit.

In 2014, he won the Academy Award for Best Sound Mixing for Gravity; he was also nominated in the same category for the films Inside Llewyn Davis and Roma.

References

External links

Mix Magazine Online-Skip Lievsay: Bringing A Musician's Ear To Film Sound

Living people
American sound designers
American audio engineers
Best Sound Mixing Academy Award winners
Best Sound BAFTA Award winners
Year of birth missing (living people)